The Minot SkyRockets were a team in the Continental Basketball Association.  They played their home games at the Minot Municipal Auditorium.  The team began play in 2005 as the San Jose Skyrockets of the American Basketball Association.  The team had a very successful first season, finishing first in the Ron Boone division with a 29-5 record.  The team advanced to the semifinals of the ABA Great Eight, losing to the Rochester Razorsharks, 106-103.

At the end of the season, the team announced they were joining the Continental Basketball Association and relocating to Minot, North Dakota. The Minot SkyRockets spent three years in North Dakota, losing the 2008 CBA finals to the Oklahoma Cavalry 3-2 before disbanding in 2009.

2006–07
DayShawn Wright, Dee Brown, Marco Killingsworth, Ryan Hollins, Pele Paelay, and Ed Nelson were selected in the 2006 CBA Draft.

2007–2008
In the 2007 draft, Larry Turner, Brad Brickens, Jeremy Overstreet, James Hughes, Courtney Bohannon, Avis Wyatt, and Adam Haluska were picked by the SkyRockets.

In January 2008, 20 local investors led by Chris Lindbo formed the Minot CBA Investment Group, LLC and purchased the SkyRockets from APEX Sportstainment. APEX also sold their CBA franchise in Great Falls, MT to Michael Tuckman in November 2007.

The Skyrockets lost the CBA championship to the Oklahoma Cavalry 96-86. The series was 3-2.

In the 2008 draft, Brian Butch, Brandon Smith, Othyus Jeffers, Dion Dowell, Sasha Kaun, and Dominique Kirk were picked by the Skyrockets

Year-by-year

Roster
2005-2006 Season
Joe Buck
Lamar Castile
Anwar Ferguson
Jamar Howard
Mark Luedtke
Anthony Lumpkin
Todd Okeson
Darius Pope
Marvin Rogers
Jason Smith
Rock Winston
Mark Magsumbol

2006-2007 Season
Steve Castleberry
Ray Cunningham
Lewis Fadipe
Desmond Ferguson
Ronnie Fields
Kenyon Gamble
David Harrison
Darnell Miller
Jason Smith
Jitim Young

2007-2008 Season
Ray Cunningham
Eric Davis
Ronnie Fields
Sidney Holmes
Kevin Johnson
Darius Mattear
Kellen Miliner
Kevin Rice
Lee Scruggs

2008-2009 Season
Courtney Bohannon
Ronnie Fields
Cory Hightower
Sidney Homes
Darius Mattear
Kellen Miliner
Kevin Rice
Maurice Shaw
John Strickland
Derek Wabbington

References

External links
Minot SkyRockets website

Continental Basketball Association teams
Sports in Minot, North Dakota
Basketball teams in North Dakota
Defunct sports teams in North Dakota